SMS Kaiserin Augusta was  a unique protected cruiser, built for the German Kaiserliche Marine (Imperial Navy) in the early 1890s. Named for Empress Augusta, who died in January 1890, she was laid down in 1890, launched in January 1892, and completed in November of that year. Owing to budgetary restrictions, Kaiserin Augusta was designed to fill both fleet scout and colonial cruiser roles. The ship was initially armed with a main battery of four  and eight  guns, which by 1896 was replaced with twelve new model 15 cm guns. She was the first ship in the German Navy to feature a three-shaft propeller arrangement.

Kaiserin Augusta served abroad between 1897 and 1902, primarily in the East Asia Squadron under the command of Admiral Otto von Diederichs. During this time, the ship's crew assisted in the suppression of the Boxer Uprising in 1900. In 1902, she returned to Germany for an extensive overhaul that lasted until 1907, after which she went into reserve. Following the outbreak of World War I in 1914, Kaiserin Augusta was mobilized to serve as a gunnery training ship. She served in this role throughout the war; the ship was ultimately sold for scrapping in October 1919 and broken up the following year.

Design

Design work on Kaiserin Augusta began in 1887 and was completed in 1889. At the time, the Chief of the Kaiserliche Admiralität (Imperial Admiralty), General Leo von Caprivi, favored a fleet of cruisers to defend German maritime interests. Caprivi, who was supported by then-prince Wilhelm, believed that such vessels should, first and foremost, have powerful engines capable of propelling them at great speed. Guns of medium caliber and light armor protection were necessary to make the ships effective combat vessels, and an impressive appearance would enhance the ability of the vessels to "show the flag". New cruisers would be needed to scout for the main battle fleet and to patrol Germany's growing colonial empire. Unlike the British Royal Navy, which had the funding and resources to build specialized scouts and overseas cruisers, budgetary restrictions forced the German Navy to design ships that could fulfill both roles.

In 1886, the two  protected cruisers were laid down; these were the first modern cruisers of the German fleet. Senior naval officers debated the type of cruiser that should be built next. Vizeadmiral (VAdm—Vice Admiral) Alexander von Monts and VAdm Wilhelm von Wickede, the Chiefs of the Marinestation der Nordsee (North Sea Naval Station) and the Marinestation der Ostsee (Baltic Sea Naval Station), respectively, favored building a pure fleet scout for the next large cruiser. Caprivi, supported by the Admiralty Council, supported the idea of building a cruiser that placed more of an emphasis on overseas cruising, which would have been a repeat of the Irene class. Caprivi's faction prevailed initially, but Caprivi resigned in 1888 over a conflict with now-Kaiser Wilhelm II and Monts replaced him as the admiralty chief. He immediately stopped design work on the vessel and instructed the design staff to prepare a new vessel that could be an effective reconnaissance ship for the main fleet.

Chief Constructor Dietrich prepared the design for the new protected cruiser. During the design process, it was determined a three-shaft arrangement of the machinery would be necessary to attain the high speed requirement. It would also improve the handling characteristics of the ship. Kaiserin Augusta was first major warship of the German Navy to use three screws. This was a relatively novel development; at the time of Kaiserin Augustas construction, only a handful of French and American ships had experimented with the arrangement, and had not yet been to sea for a thorough evaluation of the design. The arrangement proved to be successful and was repeated with the s. Kaiserin Augusta was in essence an enlarged version of the aviso , with increased speed, a more powerful main battery, and heavier armor.

General characteristics and machinery

Her hull was constructed with transverse and longitudinal steel frames; the outer wall consisted of a single layer of timber planks covered with Muntz metal sheathing to protect the wood from fouling. The hull contained ten watertight compartments and a double bottom that ran for 55 percent of the length of the vessel. She was fitted with two pole masts equipped with fighting tops.

Kaiserin Augustas crew consisted of 13 officers and 417 enlisted men. She carried several smaller boats, including two picket boats, one launch, one pinnace, two cutters, two yawls, and two dinghies. The ship suffered from severe pitch and roll, though these effects were reduced in heavy winds and a beam sea. The forecastle shipped excessive amounts of water in a head sea. The ship maneuvered poorly, though this was improved at high speed.

Each engine had its own separate engine room. The engines were supplied with steam by eight cylindrical double fire-tube boilers split into three boiler rooms. The boilers were ducted into three funnels. This rendered her one of the fastest cruisers in the world at the time, and she was the fastest ship in the German fleet at the time of her completion. Kaiserin Augusta was equipped with four electrical generators providing 48 kilowatts at 67 volts. Steering was controlled by a single rudder.

Armament
As built, Kaiserin Augusta was initially armed with a main battery of four  K L/30 guns with a total of 292 rounds of ammunition. This was supported by a secondary battery of eight  SK L/35 guns with 777 rounds of ammunition. She also carried eight  SK L/30 guns with 1,361 rounds of ammunition and four machine guns. The medium-caliber 15 cm and 10.5 cm guns were mounted in sponsoned casemates in the main deck of the ship. The ship was also equipped with five  torpedo tubes with thirteen torpedoes; four were placed in swivel mounts on the broadside and one was placed in the bow, below the waterline. The guns were supplied with a total of 1,064 shells; like the previous battery, these guns were placed in casemates in the hull. After 1907, the swivel-mounted torpedo tubes were removed, leaving only the tube in the bow with three torpedoes.

Service history

Construction – 1896

The keel for Kaiserin Augusta was laid down at the Germaniawerft shipyard in Kiel in 1890. She was launched on 15 January 1892, and at the ceremony the vessel was christened Kaiserin Augusta by Prince Heinrich of Prussia, the grandson of the ship's namesake, Empress Augusta. The ship, completed with her provisional armament, was commissioned to begin sea trials less than a year later on 17 November 1892. The trials were interrupted by the need to send modern cruisers to represent Germany at a celebration of Christopher Columbus's first voyage across the Atlantic Ocean. Celebrations in Genoa, Italy, earlier that year prompted negative remarks over the German representative, the protected cruiser . As a result, Kaiserin Augustas trials were interrupted in early 1893 to send her and the unprotected cruiser  to New York City in the United States for the ceremonies. Kaiserin Augusta left Kiel on 29 March under the command of Kapitän zur See (KzS—Captain at Sea) Wilhelm Büchsel and met Seeadler in Halifax, Canada. There, Kaiserin Augusta took Seeadler in tow, the latter vessel having run out of coal. The ships then proceeded to New York for the celebrations before departing on 13 May. Seeadler returned to German East Africa while Kaiserin Augusta re-crossed the Atlantic, arriving in Kiel on 2 June.

The voyage had revealed structural problems with the ship, and so she was decommissioned for modifications on 21 June. During this period, her standard armament was installed as well. Work was completed by mid-1894, but Kaiserin Augustas engines broke down during initial trials and had to be rebuilt completely. Repairs were not finished until early 1895, and she was finally ready to be recommissioned on 3 April. Further trials followed, and on 9 May she accidentally ran aground in the Kieler Förde. She was pulled free by the old ironclad  and some shipyard tugboats. After repairs were completed, she participated in the opening ceremonies for the Kaiser Wilhelm Canal on 21 June. She led a group of twenty-one unarmored ships, in company with the four s, the four s, and four of the s.

Two German merchants had been murdered in Morocco; the protected cruiser  had been sent to secure an indemnity, but the German government determined that the amount Morocco had agreed to pay was insufficient. I Squadron, which was on a training cruise in the Mediterranean Sea, extended their cruise so that it would also be in the region to apply pressure on the Moroccan government. Schuckmann participated in the negotiations, along with the German ambassador. The German gunboat diplomacy was successful and achieved its aims, but the operation was heavily criticized, especially in Britain, where anti-German sentiment was beginning to rise. Kaiserin Augusta left Tangier on 5 August and arrived in German waters on 18 August, where she joined the annual fleet maneuvers. On 20 December, she finally completed sea trials, and three days later was assigned as a guard ship in Wilhelmshaven. While there, she also served as a training vessel for engine room personnel. From 10 March 1896, Kaiserin Augusta escorted Wilhelm II's yacht Hohenzollern on a cruise in the Mediterranean that lasted until 1 May. From late June to 8 November, the ship was occupied with extensive individual and squadron training exercises.

1897 – 1902

In February 1897, an international naval demonstration took place off Crete to protest Greece's attempted annexation of the island and prevent another Greco-Turkish war. Kaiserin Augusta was the sole German contribution to the International Squadron, receiving orders to join the fleet on 6 February and arriving in Souda Bay on 21 February. Korvettenkapitän (KK—Corvette Captain) Leopold Koellner, the ship's commander, was under orders to act on his own discretion, but also in accordance with the warships of the other Great Powers. Kaiserin Augusta and other vessels shelled Greek volunteers that were attacking Chania on 21 February. On 15 March, she sent fifty men ashore to reinforce the international landing party that had gone ashore to stop the fighting. The ship operated as part of a "Light Division", along with the Italian torpedo cruiser , the Austro-Hungarian cruiser , the French destroyer , and the Russian gunboat . The ships were tasked with blocking Greek attacks on the area around Souda Bay; for her efforts in stopping their attacks, the Greek volunteers nicknamed her "the damned white ship".

Despite the efforts of the Great Powers, the Greco-Turkish War of 1897 broke out on 17 April. Ottoman successes in the conflict threatened to provoke a revolution in Greece, and so the International Squadron sent most of its ships, including Kaiserin Augusta, to Piraeus in an attempt to stabilize the country. On 8 November, Kaiserin Augusta went to Smyrna in the Ottoman Empire, where she received orders to go to East Asia. The ship returned to Crete on 19 November to retrieve her landing party before embarking on the voyage to Asia. Immediately following the seizure of the Kiautschou Bay concession in China, Admiral Otto von Diederichs, the commander of the East Asia Squadron, requested reinforcements to secure the new colonial territory; he specifically asked for Kaiserin Augusta, along with additional ground troops to garrison the port. As Kaiserin Augusta had been stationed in the Mediterranean, she arrived first, on 30 December.

Kaiserin Augusta remained in Tsingtao in the Kiautschou concession until mid-March 1898, when she left to visit the British colony at Hong Kong. She thereafter went on a cruise in the Yellow Sea and visited Nagasaki, Japan, where Diederichs temporarily came aboard the vessel. Beginning in November, KzS Ernst Gülich served as the ship's commander. Following the outbreak of the Spanish–American War in 1898, Diederichs was ordered to proceed to the Philippines, where Commodore George Dewey had defeated a Spanish squadron commanded by Rear Admiral Patricio Montojo. Diederichs was instructed to protect local German interests, and if possible, seize another colonial concession in the Philippines. With his ships dispersed on various colonial missions or under repair, Diederichs initially concentrated his forces slowly; he recalled Kaiserin Augusta to serve as his flagship while the rest of the force assembled. After the end of the Battle of Manila, Kaiserin Augusta steamed to Hong Kong on 13 August, arriving two days later. There the ship notified Berlin of the defeat of the Spanish garrison. She also carried the former Governor General of the Philippines, Basilio Augustín, out of Manila. 

In October, the ship brought a detachment of infantry to Taku at the request of the German ambassador to China. The men then traveled overland to Peking to guard the German legation there. On 23 November, Kaiserin Augusta participated in the erection ceremony for the Iltis monument in Shanghai, China that commemorated the men killed in the wrecking of the gunboat . She thereafter returned to Tsingtao and went on tours of Chinese and Japanese waters for the rest of the year. On 27 February 1899, the ship was reclassified as a "Grosser Kreuzer" (Large Cruiser). The rest of the year passed uneventfully; in October she went to Weihaiwei for an overhaul that lasted until 5 February 1900. In late March, the Boxer Uprising broke out in China, prompting the European fleets in Asia to send warships to Taku. Kaiserin Augusta sent carried men from III Seebataillon to Taku. She put sixty men from her crew to assist with Admiral Edward Seymour's relief force to rescue the Europeans in Tientsin. During these operations, the ship's executive officer, KK Oltmann, was killed in battle. On 18 July, part of the landing party returned to the ship, but the rest remained ashore until mid-September.

Kaiserin Augusta served briefly as the squadron flagship, under VAdm Emil Felix von Bendemann, from 26 October to 18 November while the armored cruiser  was unavailable. She spent 1901 in Chinese and Japanese waters, with no events of note during the year. Fregattenkapitän (FK—Frigate Captain) Johannes Stein served as the ship's commander from January to November 1901, when he was replaced by FK Friedrich von Ingenohl, though he remained aboard only until March 1902. Ingenohl was relieved by KzS Carl Derzewski. The vessels arrived back in Kiel on 7 June, and Kaiserin Augusta was decommissioned there on 16 June.

Later career
Obsolescent by the early 1900s, Kaiserin Augusta went into drydock for an extensive modernization that began in May 1903. During the refit, the ship's generators were replaced with more powerful units that more than doubled electrical output, at 124 kW at 110 V. Her bridge was significantly expanded, with a second deck and extended aft of the foremast. The four swivel-mounted torpedo tubes were also removed during this period. After emerging from the modernization in late 1905, the ship was placed in reserve. She remained out of service until 1914, following the outbreak of World War I in July that year. Kaiserin Augusta was reactivated for use as a gunnery training ship, to replace the more modern armored cruiser , which joined the High Seas Fleet. Her first commander during the war, from August to November, was KzS Ferdinand Bertram. Kaiserin Augusta was stationed in the Baltic Sea and was assigned to the coastal defense division of the Baltic in anticipation of a British attack through the Danish straits.

To facilitate the training of gunners, the ship's armament was diversified several times throughout the war. The first change was completed on 30 October, when her 15 cm guns were removed. By the end of 1914, the threat of a direct British attack on the Baltic had receded, and so on 12 December, Kaiserin Augusta was removed from the coastal defense division. The ship largely remained in the relative safety of the western Baltic for the rest of the war. Further alterations were made to her armament as the war progressed. By the end of the conflict, she carried one 15 cm SK L/45 gun, four 10.5 cm SK L/45 guns, four  SK L/45 guns, four 8.8 cm SK L/35 guns, five 8.8 cm SK L/30 guns, and one 8.8 cm SK L/30 gun in a U-boat mounting. She served in this capacity for the duration of the war, until she was decommissioned 14 December 1918. The ship was formally stricken from the naval register on 1 October 1919 and sold to Norddeutsche Tiefbauges in Berlin, and broken up the next year in Kiel-Nordmole.

Footnotes

References

Further reading
 

Cruisers of the Imperial German Navy
Ships built in Kiel
1892 ships
World War I cruisers of Germany